Goodenia tripartita is a species of flowering plant in the family Goodeniaceae and is endemic to the south-west of Western Australia. It is a low-lying to prostrate herb with elliptic to egg-shaped leaves with the narrower end towards the base, mostly at the base of the plant, and racemes of bright yellow flowers.

Description
Flowering occurs from August to October.

Taxonomy and naming
Goodenia tripartita was first formally described in 1990 by Roger Charles Carolin in the journal Telopea from a specimen he collected between Ongerup and Ravensthorpe in 1961. The specific epithet (tripartita) means "three-partite", referring to the shape of the foliage hair.

Distribution
This goodenia grows in heath in sandy soil, and is found between Morawa, Newdegate and the Stirling Range.

Conservation status
Goodenia tripartita is classified as "not threatened" by the Government of Western Australia Department of Parks and Wildlife.

References

tripartita
Eudicots of Western Australia
Plants described in 1990
Taxa named by Roger Charles Carolin